Go Hyun-jung (born March 2, 1971) is a South Korean actress. She debuted in the entertainment industry as a Miss Korea runner-up in 1989 and went on to star in Sandglass (1995), one of the highest-rated and critically acclaimed dramas in Korean television history. She retired after marrying chaebol Chung Yong-jin in 1995, then returned to acting after their divorce in 2003. Go has since regained her top star status in Korea, becoming the highest-paid actress on TV after the success of her series Queen Seondeok (2009) and Daemul (2010).

Life and career

Early career and retirement
Go Hyun-jung graduated from Dongguk University with a degree in Performing Arts. She was a runner-up in the Miss Korea pageant in 1989, which launched her acting career. Her big break came in the 1995 SBS drama Sandglass. The drama dealt with modern Korean history from 1970 to the 1990s and was one of the highest rated dramas in Korean television history, with average ratings of 50.8% and a peak of 64.5%. People would rush home just to see a new episode, saying “it's time to go home,” which meant they had to go home to watch Sandglass. However, following her marriage, Go announced her retirement from the industry.

Television comeback and films
She staged a comeback in the 2005 melodrama Spring Day, which she followed up with May–December romantic comedy What's Up Fox? and police procedural H.I.T.

Not content with her small screen success, Go began her late-blooming movie career by going against her image and taking pay cuts to star in non-mainstream films. She was part of the ensemble cast in arthouse films Woman on the Beach and Like You Know It All by auteur Hong Sang-soo. She then starred in Actresses, a semi-improvisational movie featuring six actresses each playing themselves. Director E J-yong, who was first inspired to make the film after going out for a drink with actresses Youn Yuh-jung and Go in 2007, said he focused on conveying the "reality" of the actresses' lives.

Career resurgence
Go regained her reputation as Korea's top actress in 2009 after playing femme fatale  royal concubine Lady Mishil in the hit historical drama Queen Seondeok. She was not the titular lead character, but her interpretation of the power-hungry main rival to the queen was impressive enough to make viewers remember the show as Mishil's story. The drama reached ratings of over 40 percent and won her the highest award at the MBC Drama Awards and Baeksang Arts Awards. Go was named Gallup Korea's Television Actor of the Year for two consecutive years (2009–10).

That same year, Go surprised fans not only by appearing on a TV entertainment show (popular talk show Golden Fishery hosted by comedian Kang Ho-dong) for the first time in 15 years, but also by very frankly addressing rumors surrounding her shrouded personal life. Once notorious for declining to appear on entertainment programs other than dramas or films, she maintained a mysterious image for a long time. Her new easy-going, and down-to-earth attitude seemingly reflected a philosophical view of the many ups and downs in life. In interviews with print and online magazines, Go has even expressed her feelings towards her ex-husband and children.

Twenty-one years after making her acting debut, Go held her very first fanmeeting on June 13, 2010—she held a press conference beforehand, sang songs for the 500 fans present, answered questions, and prepared video clips.

Though plagued with production issues prior to airing, Go returned to television ten months later in Daemul, which means "big shot" or "big thing" in Korean. In the drama, Go plays Seo Hye-rim, an anchorwoman who enters politics after the death of her war correspondent husband and becomes the nation's first female president. The 24-episode series revolves around an ordinary woman in extraordinary circumstances: how and why she became head of state and also the complicated schemes and plots surrounding her, her presidency, allies, and enemies. Besides its star-studded cast (Go starred opposite Korean Wave star Kwon Sang-woo), the show's ratings was helped by its controversial plot, which included events from Korea's recent past such as a presidential impeachment and the sinking of a Navy warship, and it topped its time slot for 11 consecutive weeks. Go repeated her feat by winning the top prize at the 2010 SBS Drama Awards.

Go also narrated the SBS documentary The Last Tundra - Movie Edition (also known as The Final Tundra - Cinema Edition) which offered a rare glimpse into the life of the Nenets, the last reindeer herding nomads living in the Siberian tundra.

2012's Miss Go (international title: Miss Conspirator) was her first commercial film, and the first film she headlined. The action comedy is about a nerdy, reclusive cartoonist with a severe case of sociophobia who somehow gets mixed up in a drug deal involving one of the biggest organized crime groups in Korea, and is forced to deal with her phobia and interact with others as she runs from the police.

Go returned to television in 2013 with The Queen's Classroom, a remake of the 2005 Japanese drama Jyoou no Kyoushitsu. The story depicts the struggle between a ferocious and ruthless elementary school teacher and her class.

In 2016, Go starred in the family melodrama Dear My Friends, playing a freelance translator, a complex and sometimes abrasive character, who observes the lives of the old people surrounding her.

In 2017, Go announced her return to the big screen with A Winter Guest Scarier than a Tiger, by acclaimed indie filmmaker Lee Kwang-kuk.

In 2018, Go starred in the legal thriller drama Return. The drama revolves around a murder case that involves powerful members of an elite class, with Go playing the role of a rags-to-riches lawyer with secrets. However halfway through the series, it was announced that she dropped out due to irreconcilable differences with the PD.

In early 2019, Go starred in the second season of My Lawyer, Mr. Jo, alongside Park Shin-yang.

In 2021, more than two years after her last project, Go returned to the small-screen with Reflection of You, a JTBC melodrama based on a novel by Jung So-hyeon.

Other activities
In 2010, after her contract ended with De Chocolate E&TF, she set up her own talent agency with her brother, Go Byung-cheol, as CEO, called IOK Company. In 2012, her Spring Day co-star and close friend, Jo In-sung, also signed on.

She published a book on skincare titled Go Hyun-jung's Texture in 2011. The actress has always been admired for her youthful appearance, largely attributed to her healthy skin which had made fans wonder about her beauty secrets. The book, arranged in the format of a documentary, contains Go's own philosophy on beauty classified under six themes—texture, color, light, line, formality, and scent—as well as her ideas on leading a sound and healthy lifestyle in general. The book is co-written by another writer who observed the actress's everyday life for six months, describing it in detail. The book became a bestseller, with all 30,000 copies of the first edition selling out in just two days of release.

At the press event for her eponymously named talk show GO Show (which premiered on April 6, 2012), Go quipped, "I became an MC because I wanted to. I want to meet a lot of people and hear their stories. I have always wanted to do that and SBS gave me that opportunity." Given her reputation for saying what is on her mind (one that has won the actress many fans), concerns arose as to how her work as show host would affect the impressive image of flawless elegance and sophistication she has gained over the years. But Go harbored little anxiety over how her public image might change, saying, "I think I can afford to put a small dent in my image and have some fun." Co-hosted by singer-songwriter Yoon Jong-shin, and comedians Jung Hyung-don and Kim Young-chul, the talk show was cancelled after eight months on the air.

In 2014, she began teaching acting at her alma mater Dongguk University, as an adjunct professor in the theater department. Back in 2006, she donated a  scholarship fund to the school.

Go also launched her own fashion brand, atti.k, a label that sells clothes, shoes, and bags. In the following year, Go then launched her own cosmetics line, koY.

In 2015, Go starred in her own reality show, which tracks her trip to Tokyo and films her preparation to launch a travel book.

Personal life
In May 1995, at the peak of her career, Go married Chung Yong-jin, vice chairman and CEO of Shinsegae Group and grandson of Samsung founder Lee Byung-chul. The two first met in New York, purely by coincidence, when Chung had offered to help Go find her seat at the Winter Garden Theatre because her English was so bad. After the most talked-about wedding in Korea at the time, Go announced her retirement from acting to focus on her new role as a chaebol's wife. They had two children together, a boy (born in 1998) and a girl (born in 2000).

After eight years of marriage, a messy divorce followed in November 2003, during which she lost complete custody of her children. Two years after the divorce, Shinsegae passed down a ruling stating that none of its department stores would be allowed to display any Go-related material, including any of her product endorsements.

Filmography

Television series

Web series

Film

Television show

Discography

Book

Awards and nominations

Listicles

References

External links

Go Hyun-jung at IOK Company

Miss Korea delegates
South Korean film actresses
South Korean television actresses
Dongguk University alumni
Miss World 1990 delegates
Living people
1971 births
People from South Jeolla Province
South Korean Buddhists